The Solomon Islands Council of Trade Unions (SICTU) is a national trade union center in the Solomon Islands.

It was created in the 1970s by the Solomon Islands General Workers' Union and had membership of over 90% of SI TUs. After the independence of SI, in 1978 the name was changed to the Solomon Islands National Union of Workers, a name that is still in some use.

In the 1980s SICTU set up the Solomon Islands Labour Party.

References

Trade unions in the Solomon Islands
Trade unions established in the 1970s